Nuria Llagostera Vives and María Vento-Kabchi were the defending champions, but Llagostera Vives did not compete this year. Vento-Kabchi teamed up with Lourdes Domínguez Lino and lost in first round to Séverine Brémond and Amélie Mauresmo.

Virginia Ruano Pascual and Paola Suárez won the title by defeating Anna Chakvetadze and Elena Vesnina 6–2, 6–4 in the final.

Seeds

Draw

Draw

References
 Main and Qualifying Draws

2006 WTA Tour
2006 China Open (tennis)